Nancy J. Koppe is a United States magistrate judge of the United States District Court for the District of Nevada.

Biography
Koppe received her A.B. in 1989 from the University of Pennsylvania and her J.D. in 1992 from Cornell Law School.  After law school, Koppe spent eight years as an Assistant District Attorney with the Philadelphia District Attorney's Office.  In 2000, Koppe joined the United States Attorney's Office for the District of Nevada, serving as Assistant United States Attorney.  She was appointed to the bench in 2013.

Koppe is known for ordering an emergency, last-minute inspection of the holographic device used produce Michael Jackson's performance at the 2014 Music Video Awards in Las Vegas, Nevada. Koppe also made headlines for finding that deletion of Facebook posts, which  allegedly contradict a party's legal claims constituted spoliation and warranted sanctions.

Awards

2006: Department of Justice's Director's Award for Superior Performance as an Assistant United States Attorney.

2011: Exemplary Public Service Award from Cornell Law School.

References

Living people
University of Pennsylvania alumni
Cornell Law School alumni
United States magistrate judges
Year of birth missing (living people)